Odostomia laevigata, common name the ovoid odostome,  is a species of sea snail, a marine gastropod mollusc in the family Pyramidellidae, the pyrams and their allies.

Description
The size of the shell varies between 3 mm and 5 mm. The thin, oblong shell is whitish, smooth and shining. The sixwhorls are slightly convex with their suture opaquely margined. The columella has a very slight fold.

Distribution
This species occurs in the following locations:
 Aruba
 Belize
 Bonaire
 Caribbean Sea
 Cayman Islands
 Colombia
 Cuba
 Curaçao
 Gulf of Mexico
 Hispaniola
 Jamaica
 Lesser Antilles
 Mexico
 Panama
 Puerto Rico
 Venezuela
 the Atlantic Ocean from North Carolina to Brazil and Argentina.

References

External links
 To Biodiversity Heritage Library (10 publications)
 To Encyclopedia of Life
 To USNM Invertebrate Zoology Mollusca Collection
 To ITIS
 To World Register of Marine Species

laevigata
Gastropods described in 1841